Doris Leslie (née Oppenheim, later Lady Fergusson Hannay) (9 March 1891 – 30 May 1982), was a British novelist and historical biographer. Her novel Peridot Flight (1956) was serialised in 10 episodes by BBC TV in October–December 1960.

A number of her books had dust jackets with illustrated designs by period artists such as Philip Gough and Arthur Barbosa.

She was married three times: in 1914 to John Leslie Isaacson (1889–1919); in 1930 to Reginald Vincent Cookes (1894–1948); and in 1936 to Walter Fergusson Leisrink Hannay, who was knighted in 1951 and died in 1961.

Works

The Starling (1927)
Fools in Mortar (1928)
The Echoing Green (1929)
Terminus (1931)
Puppets Parade (1932)
Full Flavour (1934)
Fair Company (1936)
Concord in Jeopardy (1938)
Another Cynthia: The Adventures of Cynthia, Lady Ffulkes (1780-1850), reconstructed from her hitherto unpublished memoirs (1939)
Royal William: the Story of a Democrat (1940); life of William IV
House in the Dust (1942)
Polonaise (1942); a romance of Chopin 
Folly's End (1944)
The Peverills (1946)
Wreath for Arabella (1948); life of Lady Arabella Stuart
That Enchantress (1950); life of Abigail Hill, Lady Marsham
The Great Corinthian (1952); portrait of the Prince Regent
A Toast to Lady Mary (1954); life of Lady Mary Wortley Montagu 
Peridot Flight: a novel reconstructed from the memoirs of Peridot, Lady Mulvarnie 1872-1955 (1956)
Tales of Grace and Favour (comprising Another Cynthia, Folly's End, & The Peverills) (1956)
As the Tree Falls(1958); later published as The King's Traitor (1971), based on the life of King Henry VIII
The Perfect Wife (1960); based on the life of Mary Anne Disraeli
I Return: The Story of François Villon (1962)
This for Caroline (1964); about Lady Caroline Lamb
Paragon Street (1965)
The Sceptre and the Rose (1967); life of Charles II and Catherine of Braganza
The Marriage of Martha Todd (1968)
House in the Dust (1969)
The Rebel Princess (1970)
A Young Wives' Tale (1971)
The Desert Queen (1972)
Dragon's Head (1973)
The Incredible Duchess (1974); life and times of Elizabeth Chudleigh
Call Back Yesterday (1975)
Notorious Lady (1976); life and times of the Countess of Blessington 
The Warrior King (1977); the reign of Richard the Lionheart
Crown of Thorns (1979); life and reign of Richard II

References

1891 births
1982 deaths
British historical novelists
20th-century British novelists
20th-century British women writers
Women historical novelists
British women novelists